Big Sur is an album by Bill Frisell which was released on the OKeh label in 2013.

Reception

Response was positive, with Metacritic assigning the album an aggregate score of 77 out of 100 based on 5 critical reviews indicating "Generally favorable reviews". In his review for Allmusic, Thom Jurek notes that, "this hour-long work is at its absolute best when taken as a whole. On Big Sur, Frisell delivers an inspired musical portrayal of the land, sky, sea, and wildlife of the region with majesty, humor, and true sophistication".

Track listing
All compositions by Bill Frisell.
 "The Music of Glen Deven Ranch" – 3:46   
 "Sing Together Like a Family" – 4:22   
 "A Good Spot" – 0:53   
 "Going to California" – 3:17   
 "The Big One" – 2:44   
 "Somewhere" – 1:32   
 "Gather Good Things" – 5:31   
 "Cry Alone" – 3:18   
 "The Animals" – 1:39   
 "Highway 1" – 4:51   
 "A Beautiful View" – 4:05   
 "Hawks" – 4:40   
 "We All Love Neil Young" – 1:39   
 "Big Sur" – 3:05   
 "On the Lookout" – 2:01   
 "Shacked Up" – 4:11
 "Walking Stick (For Jim Cox)" – 4:10   
 "Song for Lana Weeks" – 4:14   
 "Far Away" – 4:36

Personnel
Bill Frisell – guitar
Jenny Scheinman – violin
Eyvind Kang – viola
Hank Roberts – cello
Rudy Royston – drums

References

External links
Simplyalbumz

Okeh Records albums
Bill Frisell albums
2013 albums